Jean Konings (4 March 1886 – 29 May 1974) was a Belgian athlete who competed at the 1908 Summer Olympics in London. In the 100 metres event, Konings placed second in his first round heat with a time of 11.6 seconds.  His loss to Reggie Walker, who had run the race in 11.0 seconds, resulted in Konings' elimination from the competition.

References

Sources
 www.sports-reference.com Jean Konings' profile
 
 
 

1886 births
1974 deaths
Belgian male sprinters
Olympic athletes of Belgium
Athletes (track and field) at the 1908 Summer Olympics